Gedung Antara ("Antara Building") is a Dutch colonial landmark in Jakarta. It is located in the vicinity of Pasar Baru area. The building is currently Antara's Institute of Journalism.

History

The building was originally office building for ANETA, the first news agency in the Dutch East Indies (now Indonesia). During the Japanese occupation period, the Antara news agency, which previously occupied a building in Buitentijgerstraat (now Jalan Pinangsia No. 30, Kota), changed its name into Yashima and moved to the building where ANETA was. Yashima changed name again into Domei.

The building was considered an important landmark in Indonesian history. After the Indonesian declaration of independence by Sukarno, Adam Malik broadcast the message through Antara radio without passing the Japanese censorship Hondokan.

At the time of the first Dutch Military Aggression (1947) after the expulsion of Japan from Indonesia, the Dutch offered the building to Apotheek Van Gorkom until 1961, when it was reused by Antara news agency again. Later, the building was used for Antara's Institute of Journalism (Lembaga Pendidikan Jurnalistik Antara) while the rear side of the building was used for the printing of internal purpose. On April 4, 1959, the Indonesian Ministry of Education and Culture Wiyono announced the building as Jakarta's heritage building.

Architecture

The building was designed in tropical Art Deco. It has a clock face and two prominent towers with lightning rod. The two meter main door is made of iron. Concrete stairs covered in brown ceramic tiles connect the building's three floors.

Currently the building deteriorates. With no proper pruning of the surrounding trees, the facade is no longer prominent.

See also

Indonesian architecture
New Indies Style

References

Literature

 
 
 

Buildings and structures in Jakarta
Cultural Properties of Indonesia in West Java